A. Govindamoorthy is an Indian film director who has worked on Tamil films. After making his debut with Karuppusamy Kuththagaithaarar (2007), he has gone on to make Vedigundu Murugesan (2009) and Pappali (2014).

Career
Govindamoorthy dropped out of engineering college after being unable to finance his studies during his third semester and then began reading Vairamuthu's "Sirpi, Unnai Sethukugiraen", which inspired him to become a film maker. After assisting Ezhil and Chimbu Deven, Govindamoorthy then began his film career by directing Karuppusamy Kuththagaithaarar (2007) starring Karan and Meenakshi, and then went on to make Vedigundu Murugesan (2009) with Pasupathy.

In 2013, Govindamurthy approached producer Ambeth Kumar with a script of Pappali (2014), who readily agreed to produce the venture after listening to his narration. He revealed that the team signed on Senthil Kumar and Ishara Nair to work on the film, as the team could not afford bigger stars and could not afford to wait for their dates. The film was released on 2014 went unnoticed and received poor reviews with a critic from Sify.com noting that the film "is a crude and crass comedy laced with sentiments", adding the "film lacks technical finesse and is difficult to sit through".

Filmography
Director

Actor
Pichaikkaran (2016)
Thondan (2017)
Kolanji (2017)
Raatchasi (2019)
 Eeswaran (2021)

References

Tamil film directors
Living people
Year of birth missing (living people)
Male actors in Tamil cinema